The Girl of Your Dreams is a 1998 Spanish drama film produced and directed by Fernando Trueba that stars Penélope Cruz, Antonio Resines, Johannes Silberschneider and Hanna Schygulla. Set during the Spanish Civil War, it centers on a fictional Andalusian actress making a film in Nazi Germany who becomes the object of Joseph Goebbels' attentions.

Plot
In 1938, while Spain is in the grip of civil war, a film team from territory held by Franco's rebels are invited to the co-production in Berlin of a musical set in 19th-century Andalusia, to be shot in separate Spanish and German versions. At first happy to be working away from their war-torn country, the group find life under Nazism increasingly unpleasant and dangerous.

Macarena, their attractive star, soon catches the eye of Goebbels, the Minister of Public Enlightenment and Propaganda, who is determined to bed her. Though she finds him repulsive, and prefers the company of Blas, the married director of the Spanish version, it is made clear to her that for the sake of the project and of Hispano-German relations she must comply.

When she points out that the extras in the film look ridiculously inauthentic, being tall and fair-haired, they are replaced by short dark Jewish and Romani prisoners from a concentration camp, under armed SS guards. An extra with whom she sympathises, a handsome Russian called Leo, escapes the guards and she smuggles him into the villa where Goebbels has installed her. When Goebbels calls round, Leo knocks him out cold.

Blas realises that this is the end of the road for the project and rushes to see Goebbels' wife, who is well aware of her husband's activities. She writes him a pass enabling Leo, Macarena and her dresser to board a plane that night. The fate of the rest of the group, who are all under arrest, is unclear.

Cast

Historical background 
During the Civil War, filmmakers from the Nationalist side found work in Germany and Italy. For example, in 1938 at the UFA studios in Babelsberg, the Spanish director Florián Rey filmed Carmen, la de Triana in Spanish and a German version called Andalusische Nächte, both starring the Argentine singer and actress Imperio Argentina with whom, according to legend, Hitler fell in love. She is reported to have sued the producers and director for using her life story without permission.

Accolades

Sequel
A sequel, La reina de España (English: The Queen of Spain), starring Penélope Cruz and Jorge Sanz, was released on 25 November 2016.

References

External links
 
 

1998 drama films
1998 films
Best Film Goya Award winners
Films about filmmaking
Drama films based on actual events
Films directed by Fernando Trueba
Films featuring a Best Actress Goya Award-winning performance
Films set in Berlin
Films set in Germany
Films set in 1939
1990s German-language films
1990s Russian-language films
Spanish Civil War films
1990s Spanish-language films
Films shot in the Czech Republic
Films with screenplays by Rafael Azcona
Films shot at Babelsberg Studios
Films about Romani people
1998 multilingual films
Spanish multilingual films
1990s Spanish films